Charles Adrian Johnson (born June 29, 1957) is a former American football defensive tackle who played professionally in the National Football League (NFL) for three seasons with the Green Bay Packers.

Johnson was a third-round draft pick by the Packers in 1979, but did not make the 1981 team when Terry Jones became a starter. After a stint with the Philadelphia Eagles on the injured reserved list in 1982, and being cut from their 1983 team, Johnson rejoined the Packers in September 1983 for the 1983 season.

References

External links
 Just Sports Stats

1957 births
Living people
American football defensive tackles
Green Bay Packers players
Maryland Terrapins football players
Players of American football from Baltimore